Siegfried "Sigi" Grabner (born 4 February 1975, in Waiern, Carinthia) is an Austrian professional snowboarder. At the 2006 Winter Olympics in Turin, Italy he won bronze in the Parallel Giant Slalom competition.

Having won the Junior World Championship 1994 in Slovenia, he decided to go professional. He won the European Championship 1995 in Finland, and became part of the Burton Alpine Team. In 2003 he won the Parallel Giant Slalom World Championship in Kreischberg, Austria. In 2005 he ranked third in Whistler, British Columbia.

In the summer of 2003 Siegfried Grabner wrote a book, "Boarder zwischen den Welten" (literally "Boarder between the worlds"). He also develops snowboards, his "SG Snowboards" became available in autumn 2005 in three variants. He won the medal at the Turin Olympics on one of his Torino raceboards.

Grabner resides in La Massana, Andorra.

World Cup victories

External links 
 Sigi Grabner – The Official Website
 FIS biography

Austrian male snowboarders
Olympic snowboarders of Austria
Olympic bronze medalists for Austria
Snowboarders at the 1998 Winter Olympics
Snowboarders at the 2002 Winter Olympics
Snowboarders at the 2006 Winter Olympics
Snowboarders at the 2010 Winter Olympics
People from Feldkirchen District
1975 births
Living people
Olympic medalists in snowboarding
People from La Massana
Medalists at the 2006 Winter Olympics
Sportspeople from Carinthia (state)